The Mark, is a class A office building that is constructed in the north-western part of Bucharest in the vicinity of the Bucharest North railway station. The construction of the building started in March 2016 and was finished in 2019  at a total cost of €66 million.

The project was announced for development in 2012 but was put on hold soon after by its developer, the real estate branch of the Austrian Erste Group, due to other large construction works underwent in the area.

See also
List of tallest buildings in Romania

References

Skyscrapers in Romania
Buildings and structures in Bucharest